The 1938 South Dakota Coyotes football team was an American football team that represented the University of South Dakota in the North Central Conference (NCC) during the 1938 college football season. In its fifth season under head coach Harry Gamage, the team compiled a 7–1 record (5–0 against NCC opponents) and outscored opponents by a total of 125 to 40. The team played its home games at Inman Field in Vermillion, South Dakota.

Schedule

References

South Dakota
South Dakota Coyotes football seasons
North Central Conference football champion seasons
South Dakota Coyotes football